Pirallahı raion is a municipal district of the city of Baku, capital of Azerbaijan. It contains three settlements: Pirallahı, Çilov and Neft Daşları.

Districts of Baku